John William "Will" Varty (born 1 October 1976 in Workington, Cumbria) is an English former footballer who played as a defender.

He played for Carlisle United and Rotherham United before dropping into non-league football in 2002 to play for his hometown club Workington. He retired from football in 2005 due to family and work commitments.

Honours
Carlisle United
Football League Trophy winner: 1997

References

External links

1976 births
Living people
English footballers
Association football defenders
Sportspeople from Workington
English Football League players
Carlisle United F.C. players
Northampton Town F.C. players
Rotherham United F.C. players
Workington A.F.C. players
Footballers from Cumbria